Guy Blaise (born 12 December 1980) is a former Luxembourg footballer who played as a centre-back for Royal Excelsior Virton in Belgium.

External links
 
 

1980 births
Living people
People from Aubange
Association football central defenders
Luxembourgian footballers
Luxembourg international footballers
Belgian footballers
Belgian people of Luxembourgian descent
R.E. Virton players
Footballers from Luxembourg (Belgium)